The Buffalo Bills Radio Network is a broadcast radio network based in Buffalo, New York. Its primary programming is broadcasts of Buffalo Bills home and away games to a network of 24 stations in upstate New York, the Northwestern and Northern Tiers of Pennsylvania, and southeastern Wyoming.

Previously, the broadcasts originated from WBEN through much of the team's history except for a period from 1971 to 1977 when WKBW was team flagship. WGR briefly carried games in the early 1990s. From 1998 through 2011, the Bills were flagshipped at WGRF, as well as other stations owned by Citadel Broadcasting. When Cumulus Media purchased Citadel in late 2011, it dropped Bills games from all of its stations at the end of the season. Cumulus never fully paid off the money Citadel owed for Bills games, instead eventually seeking to nullify the debt in January 2018 when the company went into bankruptcy. Entercom Communications and Galaxy Communications picked up the rights, restoring broadcasts to WGR for the 2012 season.

During the time of the Bills Toronto Series, the station was carried on The Fan 590 in Toronto, Ontario, Canada. CHML in Hamilton also briefly carried games in the late 2010s but dropped them after re-securing the rights to the team it had carried for much of its history, the Hamilton Tiger-Cats. As of 2022, the Bills have no Canadian affiliates, though WGR is audible through much of Southern Ontario.

The station added an affiliate in Wyoming in 2021, KGAB in Laramie County, Wyoming, mainly to allow Wyoming Cowboys football fans to follow Bills starting quarterback and Wyoming alumnus Josh Allen.

Chris Brown, formerly a Buffalo Destroyers play-by-play announcer who had most recently been studio host for the Bills' shows on MSG Western New York, is currently serving as interim play-by-play announcer, with former Bills offensive lineman Eric Wood as color commentator and WGR employee Sal Capaccio as sideline reporter.

The network is an autonomous organization from the team, and is unique in that it, and not the team itself, was the main sponsor of the Bills' cheerleaders, the Buffalo Jills, until that squad was disbanded due to legal disputes.

Van Miller was the voice of the Buffalo Bills from the team's inception until 2003, with the exception of 1972 to 1978, when WKBW controlled radio rights and Miller's TV employer, WBEN-TV (now WIVB), would not permit him to appear on WKBW broadcasts. Miller was succeeded by John Murphy, his longtime color commentator, when he retired from the booth after the 2003 season. Murphy has been off-air since January 2023 due to a stroke.

Stations

The WGR and network broadcast incorporates a broadcast delay; the WWKB broadcast is live, and is intended for listeners inside Highmark Stadium. If the Bills ever reach the Super Bowl, the Bills' home-team broadcast would air on WWKB. Since WWKB has a clear channel signal, it would allow the Bills' broadcast to be heard across the East Coast.

Announcers

Play-by-play
Van Miller (1960–1971, 1978–2003)
Al Meltzer and Rick Azar (1972–1977)
John Murphy (2004–present)

Color analysts
Ralph Hubbell and Dick Rifenburg (1960–?)
Ed Rutkowski (1973–1977, 1990)
Don Gilbert (1978–79)
Stan Barron and Jefferson Kaye (1978–1983)
John Murphy (1984–1989, 1994–2003)
Greg Brown (1991–1993)
Alex Van Pelt (2004)
Mark Kelso (2006–2018)
Steve Tasker (2020)
Eric Wood (2019, 2021–present)

Sideline reporters
Jeff Burris (2006)
Paul Peck (2005, 2007–2008)
Rich Gaenzler (2009–11)
Joe Buscaglia (2012–2014)
Sal Capaccio (2014–present)

Studio hosts
Rich Gaenzler (2004–2008)
Brent Axe (2009–2011)
Howard Simon (2004, 2012–2019)
Sal Capaccio (2012–2013)
Jeremy White (2012-present)
Nate Geary (2020-present)
Joe DiBiase (2020-present)

References

External links
 Official listing as of the start of the 2022 season.

National Football League on the radio
Audacy, Inc. radio stations
Sports radio networks in the United States